Yelena Aleksandrovna Kuzmina (17 February 1909 – 15 October 1979) was a Soviet and Russian film actress. People's Artist of the RSFSR (1950).

Filmography
 
 The New Babylon (1929) as saleswoman Louise Poirier
 Alone (1931) as teacher Yelena Kuzmina
Horizon (1932) as Rosie
 Outskirts (1933) as Manka Greshina
 By the Bluest of Seas (1936) as fisherwoman Mariya
 The Thirteen (1936) as Marya Nikolayevna Zhuravlyova
 Dream (1941) as Anna
 Girl No. 217 (1944) as Tatyana Krylova
The Russian Question (1947) as Jessie West
Secret Mission (1950) as Marta Shirke
 Attack from the Sea (1953) as Emma Hamilton
Trouble (1977) as Alevtina Ivanovna Kuligina

References

External links

1909 births
1979 deaths
20th-century Russian actresses
Actors from Tbilisi
Honored Artists of the RSFSR
People's Artists of the RSFSR
Stalin Prize winners
Russian film actresses
Soviet film actresses
Burials at Novodevichy Cemetery